María Margarita Suárez Sierra (January 5, 1936 – September 6, 1963), better known as Margarita Sierra, was a Spanish-American singer, dancer, and actress perhaps best known for her supporting role as the nightclub-singing Cha Cha O'Brien on the early 1960s ABC/Warner Bros. television series, Surfside 6, with Troy Donahue, Van Williams, Lee Patterson, and Diane McBain.

Episodes of Surfside 6 often featured Sierra singing, usually in English, but occasionally in Spanish. "The Cha Cha Twist", a song featured during the show's second and final season, was released as a single on Warner Bros. Records, but did not enter the Billboard Top 100 chart.

Sierra died in Hollywood, California, in 1963 at the age of 27, from complications following heart surgery performed a day earlier. She is interred at Holy Cross Cemetery in Culver City.

Television
1957: Tonight Starring Jack Paar, guest appearance
1960–1962: Surfside 6, nightclub singer Cha Cha O'Brien

References

External links

Margarita Sierra – The Private Life and Times of Margarita Sierra
Margarita Sierra bio
Classic TV & Movie Hits – Margarita Sierra

1936 births
1963 deaths
Spanish women singers
Spanish actresses
Singers from Madrid
Actresses from Los Angeles
Burials at Holy Cross Cemetery, Culver City
Warner Bros. contract players
Singers from Los Angeles
20th-century American actresses
20th-century American singers
20th-century Spanish musicians
20th-century American women singers
20th-century Spanish women